WREA-LP (104.9 FM, "Radio Redentor") is a radio station licensed to serve Holyoke, Massachusetts.  The station is owned by Radio Redentor. It airs Spanish-language religious programming.

The station was assigned the WREA-LP call letters by the Federal Communications Commission on November 29, 2005.

Another Spanish-language religious station, WLHZ-LP in Springfield, had also been assigned the 104.9 MHz frequency but in March 2008 received a construction permit from the FCC to relocate to 107.9 MHz to avoid interference with WREA-LP.

References

External links
WREA-LP official website
 
WREA-LP Antenna and Transmitter Site photos

REA-LP
REA-LP
Mass media in Holyoke, Massachusetts
REA-LP
2005 establishments in Massachusetts
Radio stations established in 2005